Liolaemus gallardoi is a species of lizard in the family  Liolaemidae. It is native to Argentina.

References

gallardoi
Reptiles described in 1982
Reptiles of Argentina
Taxa named by José Miguel Alfredo María Cei